Point Grey (PGP) is an independent film and television production company founded in 2011 by Seth Rogen and Evan Goldberg. The name of the company comes from Vancouver's Point Grey Secondary School, where Rogen and Goldberg met.

History 
Founded by Seth Rogen and Evan Goldberg on February 12, 2011, the company was named after Vancouver's Point Grey Secondary School, where Rogen and Goldberg met. On September 24, 2013, it produced their first animated feature Sausage Party. On February 6, 2014, the company had developed its first TV project Preacher on AMC. On March 5, 2014, the company entered a pact with movie studio Good Universe in order to develop movie comedies.

In 2018, the duo were in talks with the film studio Lionsgate. The talks were finalised the next year.

Filmography

Released

Upcoming

In development

Documentaries

Television series

Released 
All television series listed are produced by Sony Pictures Television, except when noted.

Upcoming 
All television series listed are produced by Sony Pictures Television, except when noted.

In development 
All television series listed are produced by Sony Pictures Television, except when noted.

Critical reception

Commercial performance

See also
 Apatow Productions, founded by Judd Apatow
 Big Talk Productions, founded by Nira Park
 Annapurna Pictures, founded by Megan Ellison

References

2011 establishments in California
Companies based in Los Angeles
Film production companies of the United States
Television production companies of the United States
Film production companies of Canada
Television production companies of Canada